Afon Annell (River Annell) is a small river in Carmarthenshire, Wales.

It is a tributary of the Afon Cothi.

Some of the waters of the Annell were previously diverted via aqueduct to serve the Roman gold mine at Dolaucothi.

References

Rivers of Carmarthenshire